The Lublin Castle is a medieval castle in Lublin, Poland, adjacent to the Old Town district and close to the city center. It is one of the oldest preserved royal residencies in Poland, initially established by High Duke Casimir II the Just. Its contemporary Gothic Revival appearance is largely due to a reconstruction undertaken in the 19th century.

History
The hill it is on was first fortified with a wood-reinforced earthen wall in the 12th century. In the first half of the 13th century, the stone keep was built. It still survives and is the tallest building of the castle, as well as the oldest standing building in the city. In the 14th century, during the reign of Casimir III the Great, the castle was rebuilt with stone walls. Probably at the same time, the castle's Chapel of the Holy Trinity was built as a royal chapel.

In the first decades of the 15th century, King Władysław II Jagiełło commissioned a set of frescoes for the chapel. They were completed in 1418 and are preserved to this day. The artist was a Ruthenian, Master Andrej, who signed his work on one of the walls. Because of their unique style, mixing Western and Eastern Orthodox influences, they are acclaimed internationally as an important historical monument.

Under the rule of the Jagiellon dynasty the castle enjoyed royal favor and frequent stays by members of the royal family. In the 16th century, it was rebuilt on a grandiose scale, under the direction of Italian masters brought from Kraków. The most momentous event in the castle's history was the signing in 1569 of the Union of Lublin, the founding act of the Polish–Lithuanian Commonwealth.

As a consequence of the wars in the 17th century (The Deluge), the castle fell into disrepair. Only the oldest sections, the keep and the chapel, remained intact. After Lublin fell under Russian rule following the territorial settlement of the Congress of Vienna in 1815, the government of Congress Poland, on the initiative of Stanisław Staszic, carried out a complete reconstruction of the castle between 1826 and 1828. The new buildings were in the English neo-Gothic style, completely different from the structures they replaced, and their new purpose was to house a criminal prison. Only the keep and the chapel were preserved in their original state.

The castle was a prison for the next 128 years: as a Tsarist prison from 1831 to 1915, in independent Poland from 1918 to 1939, and most infamously during the Nazi German occupation of the city from 1939 to 1944, when between 40,000 and 80,000 inmates, many of them Polish resistance fighters and Jews, passed through. Just before withdrawing in 1944, the German prison officers and SS massacred its remaining 300 prisoners. After 1944, the castle continued as a prison of the Soviet secret police and later of the Soviet-installed communist regime of Poland and, until 1954, about 35,000 Poles fighting against the new communist government (especially cursed soldiers) passed through it, of whom 333 died.

In 1954, the castle prison was closed. Following reconstruction and refurbishment, since 1957 it has been the main site of the National Museum.

Gallery

See also
 Castles in Poland

References

External links

Lublin Castle and National Museum of Lublin webpage

Buildings and structures in Lublin
Castles in Lublin Voivodeship
Gothic Revival architecture in Poland
Historic house museums in Poland
History of Lublin
Museums in Lublin Voivodeship
Residences of Polish monarchs
Royal residences in Poland
12th-century establishments in Poland
Buildings and structures in the Polish–Lithuanian Commonwealth
Massacres of Poles
Nazi war crimes in Poland